The Hour We Knew Nothing of Each Other is a one-act play without words written by Peter Handke. The play has 450 characters and focuses on a day in the life of an unspecified town square. It was first performed in 1992.

Plot
In an interview with Sigrid Löffler for Profil in May 1992, Handke described the idea behind the play:
The trigger for the play was an afternoon several years ago. I'd spent the entire day on a little square in Muggia near Trieste. I sat on the terrace of a café and watched life pass by. I got into a real state of observation, perhaps this was helped along a bit by the wine. Every little thing became significant (without being symbolic). The tiniest procedures seemed significant of the world. After three or four hours a hearse drew up in front of a house, men entered and came out with a coffin, onlookers assembled and then dispersed, the hearse drove away. After that the hustle and bustle continued - the milling of tourists, natives and workers. Those who came after this occurrence didn't know what had gone on before. But for me, who had seen it, everything that happened after the incident with the hearse seemed somewhat coloured by it. None of the people on the square knew anything of each other - hence the title. But we,the onlookers see them as sculptures who sculpt each other through what goes on before and after. Only through what comes after does that which has gone before gain contours; and what went on before sculpts what is to come.

Productions
The play was first staged in Vienna in 1992. It was first performed in the UK at the Edinburgh Festival in 1994.

It was produced with a new translation by Meredith Oakes at the Lyttelton Theatre, National Theatre, London, opening on 13 February 2008. The production ran until 12 April. It was directed by James Macdonald with Jonathan Burrows as associate director and featured the following ensemble cast:
 Susan Brown
 Jessie Burton
 Pip Carter
 Paul Chesterton
 Lisa Dillon
 Callum Dixon
 Noma Dumezweni
 Susan Engel
 Susannah Fielding
 Mark Hadfield
 Amy Hall
 Daniel Hawksford
 Tom Hickey
 Richard Hope
 Mairead McKinley
 Nick Malinowski
 Shereen Martineau
 Justine Mitchell
 Daniel Poyser
 Adrian Schiller
 Amit Shah
 Sara Stewart
 Giles Terera
 Jason Thorpe
 Harry Towb
 Simon Wilson
 Sarah Woodward

The technical crew were as follows:
 Set Designer - Hildegard Bechtler
 Costume Designer - Moritz Junge
 Lighting Designer - Jean Kalman
 Music - Mel Mercier
 Sound Designer - Christopher Shutt

In 2009, Tantrum Theatre performed The Hour We Knew Nothing Of Each Other in the open-air of Wheeler Place, Newcastle, Australia.

The play was staged at the Royal Lyceum Theatre in Edinburgh in the Meredith Oakes translation from 31 May to 2 June 2018. It was directed by Wils Wilson and Janice Parker. The 450 characters were played by a community cast of more than 90 non-professional Edinburgh residents.

References

External links
, remotegoat.co.uk review

1992 plays
One-act plays
Plays by Peter Handke